is a railway station on the Fujikyuko Line in the city of Fujiyoshida, Yamanashi, Japan, operated by the private railway operator Fuji Kyuko (Fujikyu). This is one of the gateway stations to Mount Fuji and Fuji Five Lakes, including Lake Kawaguchi and Lake Yamanaka.

Lines

Station layout

The station is a terminus station where trains reverse en route between Ōtsuki and Kawaguchiko, this means for through trains heading towards either destinations, the driver is required to change ends to head back out before diverging onto the appropriate route. It consists of three bay platforms. It has waiting rooms and toilet facilities. The station is staffed.

Platforms

Adjacent stations

History
It was renamed on 1 July 2011, following renovations overseen by industrial designer Eiji Mitooka.

Passenger statistics
In fiscal 2011, the station was used by an average of 1,406 passengers daily.

Surrounding area
 Hibarigaoka High School
 Yoshida Junior High School
 Yoshida Elementary School

Bus services

Long-distance services 
 Chūō Kōsoku Bus; For Shinjuku Station
 For Tokyo Station
 For Shibuya Station (Shibuya Mark City)
 Chūō Kōsoku Bus; For Seiseki-sakuragaoka Station, Tama-Center Station, and Minami-ōsawa Station
 For Ikebukuro Station, Kawagoe Station, and Ōmiya Station
 Airport Limousine; For Shinagawa Station and Haneda Airport
 Airport Limousine; For Akihabara Station and Narita International Airport
 Resort Express; For Nagoya Station
 For Nyūkawa and Takayama Station
 For Fukui Station (Fukui), Komatsu Station and Kanazawa Station
 Fujiyama Liner; For Kyoto Station, Osaka Station, Namba Station (OCAT), and Ōsaka Abenobashi Station
 Hakata-Fujiyama Express; For Kokura Station, Nishitetsu Fukuoka Station (Tenjin), and Hakata Station

Local routes 
 For Mount Fuji 5th stage
 For Gotemba Station and Gotemba Premium Outlets via Oshino and Lake Yamanaka
 For Shin-Fuji Station (Tokaido Shinkansen) via Lake Motosu and Fujinomiya Station
 For Kofu Station via Isawa-onsen Station
 For Kawaguchiko Station via Fuji-Q Highland

References

External links

 Fujikyu station information
 Mt. Fuji Bus Access (Fujikyu Bus)

Railway stations in Yamanashi Prefecture
Railway stations in Japan opened in 1929
Stations of Fuji Kyuko
Fujiyoshida